Sengkang is a town in the South Sulawesi province of Indonesia and it is the seat (capital) of Wajo Regency. It lies on the east side of Lake Tempe.

Climate
Sengkang has a tropical rainforest climate (Af) with moderate to heavy rainfall year-round.

References

Gallery

Populated places in South Sulawesi
Regency seats of South Sulawesi